Thumbsucker or thumb sucking may refer to:

 Thumb sucking
 Thumbsucker (novel), a 1999 novel by Walter Kirn
 Thumbsucker (film), a 2005 film directed by Mike Mills based on the novel
 Thumbsucker (soundtrack), the soundtrack to the 2005 film
 (journalistic slang) a lengthy think piece or editorial on a complex topic
 A mode of data theft